Newport West may refer to:

Newport West, a United Kingdom Parliament constituency
Newport West, a Senedd constituency
 Newport West railway station